Ryan Ray Franklin (born March 5, 1973), is an American former professional baseball pitcher, who played in Major League Baseball (MLB) for the Seattle Mariners, Philadelphia Phillies, Cincinnati Reds, and St. Louis Cardinals. Franklin  currently works in the Cardinals’ front office.

Early life
He was born in Fort Smith, Arkansas and grew up in Spiro, Oklahoma. He graduated from high school in Spiro in 1991 and was named to the All-State baseball team. He went to Seminole Junior College, in Oklahoma, where he had a 20–0 win–loss record over two years.

Playing career

Seattle Mariners
Franklin was drafted by the Seattle Mariners in the 23rd round of the 1992 MLB draft but chose to return to school. He signed his first MLB contract with the team on May 21, 1993. He made his MLB debut in 1999, appearing in 6 games.  In 2000, he began the season in Triple-A, and then decided (with club permission) to not play at the MLB in September in order to participate in the Olympics.  During those Olympics in Sydney, he and his teammates won a gold medal, defeating Cuba 4–0 in the title game.  After missing the 2000 season in the big leagues, Franklin posted a strong spring training and won a job in the Mariners bullpen, appearing in 38 games. The next season, Franklin began the season in the bullpen but after the first half of the season, was moved to the rotation. He finished with a record of 7–5 in 41 appearances, 12 starts. In 2003, Franklin began in the rotation and was one of the Mariners most consistent starters, posting an ERA of 3.57 in 212 innings. He tied for the Major League lead in home runs allowed in 2003, with 34.

In 2004, Franklin and the whole Seattle team struggled, losing 99 games. Franklin for his part went 4–16 with a 4.90 ERA in 200 innings. He struck out a career high 104. In 2005, he went 8–15 with a career high 5.10 in 190 innings. He struck out 93. After the 2005 season, Franklin filed for free agency.

Philadelphia Phillies
On January 13,  Franklin signed a one-year, $2.5 million contract with the Philadelphia Phillies. Franklin shifted back to a bullpen role, appearing in 46 games.

Cincinnati Reds
On August 7, 2006, Franklin was traded to the Cincinnati Reds for a player to be named later, who turned out to be minor league pitcher Zac Stott. Franklin pitched the rest of the season out of the bullpen, appearing in 20 games.

St. Louis Cardinals
On January 22, Franklin signed with the St. Louis Cardinals on a one-year, $1 million contract. He signed a two-year, $5 million contract extension with a $2.75 million club option for 2010 on July 5, 2007. He was promoted to closer on May 17, . Franklin was named to the 2009 All-Star Game roster. On September 1, Franklin signed a two-year, $6.5 million contract extension with the Cardinals. In 2009, he finished the regular season with a 1.92 ERA, and 38 saves.

On April 19, 2011, Franklin (who blew 2 saves in 29 chances in the 2010 season) was removed from his closer role after (among other struggles on the mound) blowing four saves in five chances to start the 2011 season. Despite the poor season he is still considered a World Series Champion in 2011 with the St. Louis Cardinals.

He was released on June 29, after recording an 8.46 ERA, giving up 44 hits (.367 batting average against), nine home runs, walking seven and striking out 17 in 27 2/3 innings for a 1.84 WHIP in 21 games with the Cardinals in 2011. He retired on December 9, 2011.

International career
Franklin was a member of the gold medal-winning Team USA at the 2000 Olympics, where he had a 3-0 pitching record in 4 appearances.

Personal life
He is married to Angie Romberg and the couple has four children: Logan, Teegan, Casen, and Kaylin. He and his family live in Shawnee, Oklahoma. His nephew, Kohl, is a professional baseball player in the Chicago Cubs organization.

On August 2, Franklin became the eighth  MLB player, and second Mariner, to test positive for steroid use, receiving a ten-day suspension. On December 13, he was named in the Mitchell Report to the Commissioner of Baseball of an Independent Investigation Into the Illegal Use of Steroids and Other Performance Enhancing Substances by Players in Major League Baseball.

See also
List of Major League Baseball players named in the Mitchell Report

References

External links

Ryan Franklin at Pura Pelota (Venezuelan Professional Baseball League)
Olympics at Sports Reference
St. Louis Cardinals Scouts

1973 births
Living people
American expatriate baseball players in Canada
American sportspeople in doping cases
Appleton Foxes players
Baseball players at the 2000 Summer Olympics
Baseball players from Arkansas
Bellingham Mariners players
Calgary Cannons players
Cincinnati Reds players
Everett AquaSox players
Major League Baseball pitchers
Major League Baseball players suspended for drug offenses
Medalists at the 2000 Summer Olympics
Memphis Chicks players
National League All-Stars
Navegantes del Magallanes players
American expatriate baseball players in Venezuela
Olympic gold medalists for the United States in baseball
Philadelphia Phillies players
Port City Roosters players
Riverside Pilots players
Seattle Mariners players
Seminole State Trojans baseball players
Sportspeople from Fort Smith, Arkansas
St. Louis Cardinals players
St. Louis Cardinals scouts
Tacoma Rainiers players
Tigres de Aragua players